English Football League Highlights is a football highlights programme on ITV4 in the United Kingdom. 

The programme covers the English Football League, replacing EFL on Quest which had been broadcast on the Quest channel. Its launch marked a return for football highlights to terrestrial television and a return to ITV after thirteen years.

ITV signed a two-year deal which also includes highlights from the EFL Cup and EFL Trophy.

Hugh Woozencroft and Jules Breach were announced as the presenters in June 2022.

The show airs on Saturday evening at 9pm on ITV4, with subsequent repeats on Saturday night and Sunday morning on ITV1, and availability on demand on ITVX.

ITV previously aired Football League Extra between August 1994 and May 2004 and The Championship between August 2004 and May 2009.

References

External links
 

2022 British television series debuts
2020s British sports television series
English Football League on television
English-language television shows
Football mass media in the United Kingdom
ITV (TV network) original programming
ITV Sport